Schatzalp-Bahn is a funicular railway in Davos, Switzerland. The line leads from Davos-Platz at 1557 m to Schatzalp at 1861 m. It has a length of 712 m at a maximum inclination of 47% with a difference of elevation of 304 m. The funicular with two cars has a single track with a passing loop. It provides access to Schatzalp and Strela skiing area. 

The funicular was completed in 1899 to provide access to the Kurhaus at Schatzalp, now Berghotel Schatzalp. It was the first funicular in the canton of Graubünden. Construction had been delayed as the concession to build the line had first been awarded to Aktiengesellschaft Kurhaus Davos and a competitor. Only in 1898 it received it exclusively. The newly created company Davosplatz-Schatzalp-Bahn then built and operated the line.

The lower station is located next to Davos Platz railway station.

Berghotel Schatzalp AG currently owns and operates the line.

Further reading

References

Gallery

External links  

 Schatzalp-Bahn

Funicular railways in Switzerland
Davos
Metre gauge railways in Switzerland
Railway lines opened in 1899